Cireșeni may refer to several places in Romania:

 Cireșeni, a village in Feliceni Commune, Harghita County
 Cireșeni, a village in Cotnari Commune, Iași County
 Cireșeni, a tributary of the Târnava Mare in Harghita County

See also 
 Cireșu (disambiguation)